Stephen Brian Cooper (22 June 1964 – 15 February 2004) was an English footballer who played as a forward. Best known for his time spent with Airdrieonians, his headed goal in the semi-final at Hampden against Hearts ensured that his side made it to the 1995 Scottish Cup final and he played the full 90 minutes against Celtic as the Diamonds lost 1–0 to a Pierre van Hooijdonk goal.

Before joining Airdrie, Cooper played for a number of clubs in England, most notably Tranmere Rovers, where he scored twice in Tranmere's successful playoff campaign in 1991 through which the club were promoted to the First Division, and also scored in the club's 3–2 defeat against Cooper's former club Birmingham City in the Associate Members' Cup Final, also in 1991. In 1984, he had a loan spell in the Netherlands with NAC Breda.

For Peterborough United, Cooper came off the bench to score a late diving header to win the 1992 Third Division play-off semi-final second leg against Huddersfield Town.

He was inducted into the Airdrie United Hall of Fame in 2004 as recognition of his service to the club.

He died in his sleep at his home in Yardley, Birmingham, on 15 February 2004, unknowingly having a bleed on the brain..

Honours
Airdrieonians
Scottish Challenge Cup: 1994–95

References

1964 births
2004 deaths
Footballers from Birmingham, West Midlands
English footballers
Association football forwards
NAC Breda players
Birmingham City F.C. players
Halifax Town A.F.C. players
Newport County A.F.C. players
Plymouth Argyle F.C. players
Barnsley F.C. players
Tranmere Rovers F.C. players
Peterborough United F.C. players
Wigan Athletic F.C. players
York City F.C. players
Airdrieonians F.C. (1878) players
Ayr United F.C. players
English Football League players
Scottish Football League players